The Neva River is a river in northwestern Russia.

Neva may also refer to:

Places
Neva, Mazandaran, a village in Iran
Neva, Wisconsin, a town in Langlade County, Wisconsin, United States
Neva (community), Wisconsin, an unincorporated community
Neva Shoal, a shoal in Hawaii
Mount Neva (Colorado)
Mount Neva (Nevada)
Neva Bay, the easternmost part of the Gulf of Finland
Neva (Italy), a short river in Liguria, Italy

Military
Neva, a Russian codename for the Soviet S-125 Neva/Pechora surface-to-air missile system
Battle of the Neva, a 1240 battle which may not have taken place
Battle of the Neva (1708), during the Swedish invasion of Russia

People
Neva (name), a list of people with either the given name or surname

Other uses
Neva  (1802 Russian ship), a ship originally called Thames, purchased and renamed by the Russians
Neva  (1813 ship), a three-masted English barque 
Nihon Ethics of Video Association, also known as "Viderin"/"Biderin", a former ratings organization of the Japanese video industry
Neva (horse), a British Thoroughbred racehorse
Neva Cup, a professional women's tennis tournament in Russia
Neva Foundation, a Swiss non-profit organization promoting cultural and scientific exchanges between Russia and Switzerland
Neva (magazine), a Russian monthly literary magazine first published in 1955
Neva Towers, a building complex consisting of two skyscrapers in Moscow, Russia